South Daytona is a city in Volusia County, Florida, United States. The population was 12,865 at the 2020 census.

History

South Daytona was once a town called Blake (named after wealthy Boston businessman Alpheus P. Blake), with some forty resident families and as many more non-resident property holders. Many of the early settlers profitably engaged in orange culture and vegetable gardening. According to the National Archives in Washington, D.C., Blake opened its first post office on August 19, 1878. Then c. 1886, the first train came as far as Daytona, and ten years later the line was extended to Miami. Soon thereafter, a railroad station was built at Big Tree Crossing.

By 1926, the towns of Daytona, Daytona Beach and Seabreeze were consolidated to create the city of Daytona Beach. Daytona Beach then proceeded to annex all the adjacent territories, including the town of Blake. Because of new taxes and appraisals levied, residents of Blake were forced to hire an attorney and eventually, c. 1938, succeeded in breaking away from Daytona Beach to become the incorporated town of South Daytona.

Soon after World War II, the town created a Building Department, followed by a Planning and Zoning Board. Builders and developers soon became interested in the area, and South Daytona started to develop. South Daytona was then in a position to request financial assistance from the federal government for expansion of utilities, streets, etc. South Daytona was the second town in the Halifax area, after Daytona Beach, to install a sanitary sewer system. The town continued to prosper and was incorporated as the City of South Daytona in 1951. South Daytona has operated under a City Manager/Council form of government since 1980, with the Mayor and four council members serving four-year, staggered terms beginning in 1990.

Geography

South Daytona is located at  (29.165310, –81.009057), on the Halifax River, just south of the city of Daytona Beach.

Demographics

As of the census of 2000, there were 13,177 people, 5,851 households, and 3,604 families residing in the city. The racial makeup of the city was 88.67% White, 7.85% African American, 0.12% Native American, 1.21% Asian, 0.05% Pacific Islander, 0.53% from other races, and 1.57% from two or more races. Hispanic or Latino of any race were 2.89% of the population.

There were 5,851 households, out of which 25.0% had children under the age of 18 living with them, 44.4% were married couples living together, 13.0% had a female householder with no husband present, and 38.4% were non-families. 29.6% of all households were made up of individuals, and 11.9% had someone living alone who was 65 years of age or older.  The average household size was 2.24 and the average family size was 2.75.

In the city, the population was spread out, with 20.3% under the age of 18, 8.7% from 18 to 24, 28.6% from 25 to 44, 23.5% from 45 to 64, and 18.9% who were 65 years of age or older.  The median age was 40 years. For every 100 females, there were 92.8 males.  For every 100 females age 18 and over, there were 89.3 males.

The median income for a household in the city was $31,180, and the median income for a family was $36,417. Males had a median income of $27,500 versus $21,676 for females. The per capita income for the city was $17,401.  About 7.9% of families and 10.7% of the population were below the poverty line, including 12.9% of those under age 18 and 7.8% of those age 65 or over.

Economy

Among the numerous corporate partners that call South Daytona home are:
 CSR Rinker (concrete products)
 Premier Bathrooms Corporate headquarters (Specialist bath tub supplier)
 International Academy (cosmetology school)
 National Association for Public Safety Communications Officers
 Coastal Designs (resin coatings)
 John's Appliance City (retail)
 Giles Electric (contractor)
 Volusia Construction
 Votran (public transit)

Shopping

 Big Tree Plaza
 Sunshine Park Mall

References

External links
 City of South Daytona official site

Cities in Volusia County, Florida
Populated places on the Intracoastal Waterway in Florida
Populated places established in 1878
Cities in Florida